With Love is an American romantic comedy streaming television series created by Gloria Calderón Kellett that premiered on Amazon Prime Video on December 17, 2021. In April 2022, the series was renewed for a second season.

Cast and characters

Main

 Emeraude Toubia as Lily Diaz
 Mark Indelicato as Jorge Diaz Jr., Lily's brother
 Isis King as Sol Perez, the Diaz siblings' maternal cousin and a trans non-binary oncologist
 Vincent Rodriguez III as Henry, Jorge's boyfriend
 Rome Flynn as Santiago Zayas
 Desmond Chiam as Nick Zhao, Jorge's best friend
 Benito Martinez as Jorge Diaz Sr., the Diaz siblings' father
 Constance Marie as Beatriz Diaz, Jorge Sr.'s wife and the Diaz siblings' mother
 Todd Grinnell as Miles Murphy, Sol's love interest who is a plastic surgeon

Recurring

 Andre Royo as Laz Zayas, Santiago's father
 Renée Victor as Marta Delgado, the Diaz siblings and Sol's grandmother
 Pepe Serna as Luis Delgado, Marta's husband
 Gloria Calderón Kellett as Gladys Delgado, Beatriz's sister and the Diaz siblings' maternal aunt

Production

Development
On May 27, 2021, it was reported that Amazon had given the production a series order. With Love is created by Gloria Calderón Kellett who also is expected to executive produce alongside Meera Menon. The pilot is written by Kellett and directed by Menon. The production companies involved with the series are GloNation and Amazon Studios. The five-episode first season of series was released on December 17, 2021. On April 8, 2022, Amazon renewed the series for a six-episode second season.

Casting
On June 3, 2021, Emeraude Toubia was cast to star. A day later, Mark Indelicato joined the main cast. On June 9, 2021, Rome Flynn, Isis King, Todd Grinnell, Desmond Chiam were cast as series regulars. Two days later, Constance Marie, Benito Martinez, and Vincent Rodriguez III joined the cast in starring roles. On June 28, 2021, Andre Royo was cast in a recurring capacity. On August 20, 2021, Renée Victor and Pepe Serna joined the cast in recurring roles. On July 11, 2022, Scott Evans was cast in an undisclosed capacity for the second season.

Episodes

Reception

Critical response
The review aggregator website Rotten Tomatoes reported a 100% approval rating with an average rating of 7/10, based on 13 critic reviews. The website's critics consensus reads, "Depicting the travails of a close-knit family with unabashed warmth, With Love tempers its earnestness with grounded characters." Metacritic, which uses a weighted average, assigned a score of 75 out of 100 based on 7 critics, indicating "generally favorable reviews".

Accolades
With Love was nominated for the Outstanding New TV Series category for the 33rd GLAAD Media Awards in 2022.

References

External links
 
 

2020s American LGBT-related comedy television series
2020s American romantic comedy television series
2021 American television series debuts
Amazon Prime Video original programming
Bisexuality-related television series
English-language television shows
Hispanic and Latino American television
Television shows set in Portland, Oregon
Transgender-related television shows
Television series by Amazon Studios